Michael Ira Shub (born August 17, 1943) is an American mathematician who has done research into dynamical systems and the complexity of real number algorithms.

Career

1967: Ph.D. and early career 
In 1967, Shub obtained his Ph.D. degree at the University of California, Berkeley with a thesis entitled Endomorphisms of Compact Differentiable Manifolds. In his Ph.D. thesis, he introduced the notion of expanding maps, which gave the first examples of structurally stable strange attractors. His advisor was Stephen Smale.

From 1967 to 1985, he worked at Brandeis University, the University of California, Santa Cruz and the Queens College at the City University of New York. In 1974, he proposed the Entropy Conjecture, an open problem in dynamical systems, which was proved by Yosef Yomdin for  mappings in 1987.

1985–2004: IBM research 
From 1985 to 2004, he joined IBM's Thomas J. Watson Research Center. In 1987, Shub published his book Global Stability of Dynamical Systems, which is often used as a reference in introductory and advanced books on the subject of dynamical systems. In 1993, Shub and Stephen Smale initiated a rigorous analysis of homotopy-based algorithms for solving systems of nonlinear algebraic equations, which has inspired much of the work in that area during the last two decades.

From 1995 to 1997, Shub was the founding chair of the Society for the Foundations of Computational Mathematics. In 2001, Shub became a founding editor of their journal, Foundations of Computational Mathematics.

1986: Blum Blum Shub 

Shub, along with coauthors Lenore and Manuel Blum, described a simple, unpredictable, secure random number generator (see Blum Blum Shub). This random generator is useful from theoretical and practical perspectives.

1989: Blum–Shub–Smale machine 

In 1989, he proposed with Lenore Blum and Stephen Smale the notion of Blum–Shub–Smale machine, an alternative to the classical Turing model of computation. Their model is used to analyse the computability of functions.

2004–2010: Post-IBM 
From 2004 to 2010, he worked at the University of Toronto. After 2010, he became a researcher at the University of Buenos Aires and at the Graduate Center of the City University of New York. Since 2016, he has been Martin and Michele Cohen Professor and Chair of the Mathematics Department at City College of New York.

Awards and recognition 

 1972: Fellow of Alfred P. Sloan Foundation.
 2000: Fellow of the American Association for the Advancement of Science.
 2012: A conference, From Dynamics to Complexity, was organized at the Fields Institute in Toronto celebrating his work.
 2015: Fellow of the American Mathematical Society "for contributions to smooth dynamics and to complexity theory."
 2016: Fulbright Specialist.

Selected publications

References

External links 
 Personal website at the City College of New York.

1943 births
Living people
20th-century American mathematicians
21st-century American mathematicians
University of California, Berkeley alumni
Fellows of the American Mathematical Society
Brandeis University faculty
City University of New York faculty
Graduate Center, CUNY faculty
City College of New York faculty
University of California, Santa Cruz faculty
Academic staff of the University of Toronto
Academic staff of the University of Buenos Aires
IBM Research computer scientists